Khalid Sa'id or Khalid Saeed is the name of:

 Khalid ibn Sa'id (d. 634 CE), a companion of Muhammad
 Khalid Saeed Ahmad al Zahrani, Saudi Arabian al-Qaida militant and Guantanamo detainee
 Khalid Saeed Batarfi, Saudi Arabian al-Qaida militant
 Khalid Saeed Khan (born 1954), Pakistani physiotherapist
 Khalid Saeed (politician) (born 1958), Pakistani politician
 Khalid Saeed Sajna, Pakistani Taliban commander
 Khalid Saeed Yafai (born 1989), British boxer
 Khaled Mohamed Saeed (1982–2010), Egyptian victim of police brutality leading to the 2011 Egyptian Revolution; see Death of Khaled Mohamed Saeed